The siege of Bijapur began in March 1685 and ended in September 1686, with Mughal victory. The siege began when Aurangzeb dispatched his son, Muhammad Azam Shah, with a force of nearly 50,000 men to capture Bijapur Fort and defeat Sikandar Adil Shah, the then ruler of Bijapur, who refused to be a vassal of the Mughal Empire. The siege of Bijapur was among the longest military engagements by the Mughals, lasting more than 15 months until Aurangzeb personally arrived to organize a victory.

Historical background

In 1637, the young Prince Aurangzeb was the Subedar of Deccan under the reign of his father the Mughal Emperor Shah Jahan. He led a 25,000 strong Mughal Army and besieged Bijapur Fort and its ruler Mohammed Adil Shah. The siege, however, was unsuccessful because the Adil Shahi dynasty sought peace with Shah Jahan mainly through the cooperation of Dara Shikoh.

Ali Adil Shah II inherited a troubled kingdom. He had to face the onslaught of the Maratha, led by Shivaji, who had fought and killed Afzal Khan, the most capable commander in the Bijapur Sultanate and the leaderless troops of Bijapur were thenceforth consequently routed by Shivaji's rebels. As a result, the Adil Shahi dynasty was greatly weakened mainly due to the rebellious Maratha, led by Shivaji and his son Sambhaji.

Sikandar Adil Shah was chosen to lead the Adil Shahi dynasty. He allied himself with Abul Hasan Qutb Shah and refused to become a vassal of the Mughal Empire. Angered by his refusal to submit to Mughal authority, Aurangzeb and the Mughal Empire declared war.

The siege
In 1685, Aurangzeb dispatched his son Muhammad Azam Shah alongside Ruhullah Khan the Mir Bakshi (organizer) with a force of nearly 50,000 men to capture Bijapur Fort. The Mughal Army arrived at Bijapur in March 1685. Elite Mughal Sowars led by Dilir Khan and Qasim Khan began to surround and capture crucial positions around Bijapur Fort. After the encirclement was complete, Prince Muhammad Azam Shah initiated siege operations by positioning cannons around Bijapur Fort.

Bijapur Fort, however, was well-defended by 30,000 men led by Sikandar Adil Shah and his commander Sarza Khan. Attacks by Mughal cannon batteries were repulsed by the large and heavy Bijapur cannons such as the famous "Malik-i-Maidan", which fired cannonballs 69 cm in diameter. Instead of capturing territories on open ground, the Mughals dug long trenches and carefully placed their artillery but made no further advancements.

The Mughals could not cross through the deep 10-ft moat surrounding Bijapur Fort. Moreover, the 50-ft high 25-ft wide fine granite and lime mortar walls were almost impossible to breach. The situation for the Mughals worsened when Maratha forces led by Melgiri Pandit under Maratha Emperor Sambhaji had severed food, gunpowder and weapon supplies arriving from the Mughal garrison at Solapur. The Mughals were now struggling on both fronts and became overburdened by the ongoing siege against Adil Shahi and the roving Maratha forces. Things worsened when a Bijapuri cannonball struck a Mughal gunpowder position causing a massive explosion into the trenches that killed 500 infantrymen.

In response to their hardships, Aurangzeb sent his son Shah Alam and his celebrated commander Abdullah Khan Bahadur Firuz Jang. Unable to allow the collapse of the Mughal Army outside Bijapur Fort, the Mughal commander Ghazi ud-Din Khan Feroze Jung I led a massive expeditionary reinforcement force to alleviate the hardships of the Mughal Army and drive out the Maratha forces. Abdullah Khan Bahadur Firuz Jang, a highly experienced Mughal commander positioned at the outpost of Rasulpur, routed a 6,000-strong infantry contingent led by Pam Naik intended to carry supplies to Bijapur Fort during a night attack.

The Mughals regained control of supply routes leading to Solapur, but no successful advancement had been made into Bijapur Fort. The lengthy siege turned into a stalemate; therefore, Aurangzeb himself gathered a massive army in July 1686 and marched slowly towards Bijapur Fort. He finally arrived outside Bijapur Fort and established encampments beside Abdullah Khan Bahadur Firuz Jang on 4 September 1686. Aurangzeb personally rode out inspiring his army of almost a 100,000 men to begin a full-scale assault. After eight days of intense fighting, the Mughals had successfully damaged the five gates of Bijapur Fort and collapsed substantial portions of the fortified walls, thus enabling them to breach the moat and conquer the city. They captured Sikandar Adil Shah who was bound in silver chains and presented before Aurangzeb.

The aftermath
Sikandar Adil Shah had suffered many wounds and ultimately died on 12 September 1686, and the Adil Shahi dynasty came to an end. Aurangzeb then appointed Syed Mian (father of the Sayyid Brothers) as the first Mughal Subedar of Bijapur.

The Mughals had annexed and conquered a weakened Bijapur, but their control of the region began to weaken after the death of Bahadur Shah I in 1712. The Nawabs in the region declared their independence after a few decades. Eventually, after 1753, the Marathas occupied much of Bijapur.

See also
Mughal weapons

Notes

References

Bijapur
Bijapur
Bijapur
Adil Shahi dynasty
1680s in India